Ramone Bailey (born 31 October 1991) is a Jamaican long jumper.

He won the gold medal at the 2018 Central American and Caribbean Games and the bronze medal at the 2018 NACAC Championships. He also competed at the 2017 World Championships without reaching the final.

His personal best jump is 8.17 metres as recorded by the IAAF, albeit lacking wind information, achieved in June 2017 in Kingston.

References

1991 births
Living people
Jamaican male long jumpers
World Athletics Championships athletes for Jamaica
Central American and Caribbean Games gold medalists for Jamaica
Competitors at the 2018 Central American and Caribbean Games
Jamaican Athletics Championships winners
Central American and Caribbean Games medalists in athletics
20th-century Jamaican people
21st-century Jamaican people